Nicole Muller may refer to:

Nicole Müller (linguist), Clinical and Celtic linguist
Nicole Müller (gymnast, born 1994), German rhythmic gymnast, competed at the 2012 Summer Olympics
Nicole Muller (gymnast, born 1989), Brazilian rhythmic gymnast, competed at the 2008 Summer Olympics
Nicole Müller (footballer), German international association footballer